The electoral history of Dianne Feinstein. Feinstein previously served as a member of the San Francisco Board of Supervisors, Mayor of San Francisco, and is an incumbent United States Senator.

San Francisco mayoral elections

1971

1975

1979

1983

California gubernatorial elections

1990

United States Senate elections

1992

1994

2000

2006

2012

2018

References 

Feinstein, Dianne